The pomegranate ellagitannins, which include punicalagin isomers, are ellagitannins found in the sarcotestas, rind (peel), bark or heartwood of pomegranates (Punica granatum).

Chemistry 
As the chemistry of punicalagins became known it was found to be not unique to pomegranate.  Punicalagins are present in numerous species of the genus Terminalia, species chebula Retz. (“Fructus Chebulae”), myriocarpa, catappa and citrina (tropical flowering trees historically used in African traditional medicine for antibiotic and antifungal purposes). They have also been isolated from Cistus salvifolius (a Mediterranean shrub) and Combretum molle (an African shrub).

Pomegranate fruits natural phenols can be extracted with ethyl acetate and fractionation can afford the ellagitannin punicalagins.

Dietary supplementation
A few dietary supplements and nutritional ingredients are available that contain extracts of whole pomegranate and/or are standardized to punicalagins, the marker compound of pomegranate. Extracts of pomegranate are also 'Generally Recognized As Safe' (GRAS) by the United States.

List of compounds 
 Pedunculagin, a compound found in the pericarp of the pomegranate (Punica granatum).
 Punicacortein A, a compound found in the bark of P. granatum and in Osbeckia chinensis
 Punicacortein B, a compound found in the bark of P. granatum
 Punicacortein C, a compound found in the bark of P. granatum
 Punicacortein D, a compound found in the bark and heartwood of P. granatum
 Punicafolin, a compound found in the leaves of Punica granatum
 Punigluconin, a compound found in the bark of P. granatum and in Emblica officinalis
 Punicalagin, a compound found in  the pericarps of P. granatum
 Punicalin, a compound found in pomegranates or in the leaves of Terminalia catappa
 Granatin A, a compound found in the pericarp of P. granatum
 Granatin B, a compound found in the fruit of P. granatum
 Diellagic acid rhamnosyl (1→4) glucopyranoside
 5-O-galloylpunicacortein D
 2-O-galloylpunicalin
 Casuarinin, a compound found in the pericarp of P. granatum
 Gallagyldilactone, a compound found in the pericarp of P. granatum
 Corilagin, a compound found in the leaves of P. granatum and other species
 Strictinin, a compound found in the leaves of P. granatum
 other phenolics 
 Ellagic acid, a constitutive compound of ellagitannins
 Gallagic acid, a compound found in many ellagitannins
 1,2,4,6-tetra-O-galloyl-β-D-glucose, a compound found in the leaves of P. granatum
 1,2,3,4,6-penta-O-galloyl-β-D-glucose, a compound found in the leaves of P. granatum and the common precursor of gallotannins and the related ellagitannins
 Brevifolin, a compound found in the leaves of P. granatum
 Brevifolin carboxylic acid, a compound found in the leaves of P. granatum
 3,6-(R)-hexahydroxydiphenoyl-(α/β)-C-glucopyranose, a compound found in the leaves of P. granatum
 1,2,6-tri-O-galloyl-β-C-glucopyranose, a compound found in the leaves of P. granatum
 1,4,6-tri-O-galloyl-β-C-glucopyranose, a compound found in the leaves of P. granatum
 3,4,8,9,10-pentahydroxydibenzo[b,d]pyran-6-one, a compound found in the leaves of P. granatum

See also 
 List of antioxidants in food

References 

Plants used in traditional African medicine